Paolo Elito Macapagal Ballesteros IV (born November 29, 1982) is a Filipino LGBTQIA+ personality, actor, comedian, TV host, model, drag queen, and impersonator. He has appeared in films and several TV shows, and has been one of the co-hosts of longtime noontime show Eat Bulaga! since 2001.

Personal life
Paolo Elito Macapagal Ballesteros IV is related to Filipino painter Fernando Amorsolo, his great-grandfather, and fellow celebrity Eula Valdez, who is his aunt.

He was romantically involved with Katrina Nevada, with whom he has a daughter, Keira Claire.

Although Ballesteros initially didn't directly confirm his sexual orientation publicly, there was already a strong indication that he was gay through his Instagram posts, his acceptance of gay roles in film and television, and his jokes about his sexuality as a host on Eat Bulaga!. He was romantically linked to several men, occasionally sharing romantic photos of them together from his own Instagram account. In April 2017, he uploaded a photo of himself with dancer Roland Ochoa Anog.; In April 2018, pictures of him with Television actor and online personality Sebastian Castro circulated online, leading to speculation of a relationship. Most recently, he has uploaded a photo of him with a non-showbiz figure Kenneth Concepcion in December 2018, once again leading netizens to believe he is in a gay relationship. In all instances, Ballesteros has never confirmed nor denied the rumors.

In August 2019, during the press conference for the film The Panti Sisters, also starring Martin del Rosario and Christian Bables, Paolo Ballesteros finally revealed to be gay saying "I am a lady!" and stated that he does not care about what people think about his sexual orientation.

In another interview, he said that his daughter, Keira Claire, 10, already knew he was gay. However, the host of Eat Bulaga! said he didn't fully explain to Claire what it's like to be gay because of her age. But at the same time, Ballesteros has always been open to her.

Career
In March 2016, he was reportedly suspended from Eat Bulaga! for six months due to the rants he posted on his Facebook account regarding the live show set-ups like about the catering and others. During his suspension, Ballesteros spent his time in portraying his main roles in two different movies: Die Beautiful and Bakit Lahat ng Gwapo May BF?. Ballesteros returned to Eat Bulaga! on September 5, 2016. Ballesteros won his first international Best Actor award for playing his role in Die Beautiful in 29th Tokyo International Film Festival.

In 2022, he was chosen to be the host of Drag Race Philippines along with recurring judges, Jiggly Caliente and Kaladkaren Davila.

Impersonation and makeup transformation
Ballesteros is renowned for his various impersonation of female and male artists and has earned international acclaim for his makeup skills.  He has posted pictures of his numerous makeup transformations through his Instagram account, transforming himself into Hollywood celebrities, as well as local artists.

For the 2016 Tokyo International Film Festival he impersonated two female celebrities. First one was Angelina Jolie (calling himself "Angelina Magdangal") during the red carpet and opening ceremony, in an Emerald Modern Filipiniana Fishtail black velvet terno gown, with typical squared sleeves, black opera gloves and black high heels. On the awards night and following press conference he emulated Julia Roberts, wearing a gold sequin dress with white high heels and white opera gloves.

Filmography

Television

Film

Awards

References

External links
 
 

1982 births
Filipino drag queens
Living people
21st-century Filipino male actors
Filipino male television actors
Filipino male comedians
Filipino male models
Filipino television talk show hosts
Gay models
GMA Network personalities
Filipino television variety show hosts
Filipino gay actors
Male actors from Nueva Ecija
People from Cabanatuan
People from Nueva Ecija
Filipino male film actors
TV5 (Philippine TV network) personalities
Drag Race Philippines